Ionuț Neagu (born 26 October 1989) is a Romanian professional footballer who plays as a box-to-box midfielder for Oțelul Galați.

Neagu has formerly played for Oțelul Galați, Steaua București, Karabükspor, Nea Salamina, Gaz Metan Mediaș, UTA Arad and Cherno More Varna. He has been capped at international level by Romania.

Club career

Oțelul Galați

Born in Galați, Neagu began his career with the youth system at Oțelul Galați. He made his professional debut as an 88th-minute substitute in a 1–1 away draw against Brașov on 22 May 2009 and finished 2008–09 season with two appearances. Neagu began to establish himself in the Oțelul first team from the 2009–10 season, making 24 league starts. On 7 March 2010, he scored his first goal in a 1–0 victory over CFR Cluj.

Steaua București
On 3 September 2013, Neagu agreed to join Steaua București after the club agreed a €620k transfer fee with Oțelul Galați.

Cherno More
On 27 June 2019, Neagu signed a contract with Bulgarian side Cherno More Varna.

Honours
Oțelul Galați
Liga I: 2010–11
Supercupa României: 2011
Liga III: 2020–21, 2021–22
Steaua București
Liga I: 2013–14, 2014–15
Cupa României: 2014–15
Romanian League Cup: 2014–15

Statistics 
Statistics accurate as of match played 25 June 2016

References

External links

1989 births
Living people
Romanian footballers
Romania under-21 international footballers
Romania international footballers
Association football midfielders
ASC Oțelul Galați players
FC Steaua București players
Kardemir Karabükspor footballers
Nea Salamis Famagusta FC players
CS Gaz Metan Mediaș players
FC UTA Arad players
PFC Cherno More Varna players
Liga I players
Liga II players
TFF First League players
Cypriot First Division players
First Professional Football League (Bulgaria) players
Romanian expatriate footballers
Romanian expatriate sportspeople in Turkey
Expatriate footballers in Turkey
Romanian expatriate sportspeople in Cyprus
Expatriate footballers in Cyprus
Romanian expatriate sportspeople in Bulgaria
Expatriate footballers in Bulgaria
Sportspeople from Galați